Duncan Greenwood (1919–1992) was an English playwright.

His plays include Cat among the Pigeons, Murder Delayed and No Time for Figleaves.

External links
Duncan Greenwood at the Playwrights Database, doollee.com

1919 births
1992 deaths
20th-century English dramatists and playwrights
English male dramatists and playwrights
20th-century English male writers